Balamurali Balu is an indian film music director and lyricist  who has worked as predominantly in tamil film industry . His First movie was Madhiyal Vell and composed  many movies like Pallu Padama Paathuka Laterly he composed movie called Peechankai  This critically acclaimed film was his debut movie as a music composer and he got appreciated by the audience . He got many compliment sutution when working in  Peechankai for giving a quirky value to the music to go along with the theme of the movie's script even got an award for the category Best Music Producer in the Regional Film group in 2018

Early life
Balamurali Balu is a professional music composer in south India. He has also worked as a music director and a film score composer. Balamurali Balu has been part of many projects in the Tamil cinema industry. Balamurali Balu was born and raised in Chennai in Tamil Nadu, India. He is currently working there and based in the same city. Balamurali Balu was born on the 16th of July. He entered the music industry in Tamil cinema in 2016 and is currently pursuing the same occupation. Balamurali Balu did his college education abroad in the United States of America. He has a degree of Ph.D. from his university which is the Georgia Institute of Technology located in Georgia in the United States of America. He specialized in the field of Chemical Engineering. He obtained his Ph.D. degree in the year 2009. Balamurali Balu then worked with the Intel Technologies company. In Early Prior to his music career, Balu completed his  PhD from Georgia Tech in chemical engineering in 2009 and worked as a Process Engineer with Intel Technologies. He is also an alumni from Berklee College of Music.

Career
In 2017, Balu got his first break in the Tamil film industry when he got an opportunity to score music for the critically acclaimed movie Peechankai. The music was well-received and appreciated for adding value to the quirkiness of the script. He won the Best Music Producer Award in the Regional Film Category at the Indian Recording Artists Association Awards 2018 for the movie.

In 2018, Balu joined hands with director Santhosh P. Jayakumar to score music for the film Hara Hara Mahadevaki, which starred Gautham Karthik. The music created a lot of attention, especially with the title song "Hara Hara Mahadevaki" becoming a viral hit. With the success of Hara Hara Mahadevaki, Balu continued with blockbuster Iruttu Araiyil Murattu Kuththu, his second collaboration with Jayakumar and Gautham Karthik. He later composed the biographical film Traffic Ramasamy, based on the life of activist Traffic Ramaswamy. Afterwards, Balu collaborated with Jayakumar for the third time with the Arya-starrer Ghajinikanth, a remake of the Telugu film Bhale Bhale Magadivoy.

In 2019, Balu composed music for Chikati Gadilo Chithakotudu, the Telugu remake of Iruttu Araiyil Murattu Kuththu, which marked his Telugu film debut.currently he is working on kuthuku pathu a temple monkey series sets to release on aha OTT.

Other work
Balu has collaborated with Lady Kash as a music producer in her albums Rap Smash and Villupaattu. He also owns Sonic Pro Studios, a music studio in Chennai.

Discography
Films

Television

References

External links 
Balamurali Balu IMDB 

Musicians from Chennai
Living people
Tamil film score composers
1970 births